DXPA (103.1 FM) Radyo Serbisyo is a radio station owned and operated by Andres Bonifacio College Broadcasting System. Its studios and transmitter are located at Purok 4, Brgy. Sta. Maria, Nabunturan.

References

Radio stations in Davao de Oro